The Galápagos martin (Progne modesta) is a species of bird in the family Hirundinidae, endemic to the Galápagos Islands.

Its natural habitats are subtropical or tropical dry shrubland, subtropical or tropical seasonally wet or flooded lowland grassland, pastureland, and heavily degraded former forest.

References

Galápagos martin
Endemic birds of the Galápagos Islands
Galápagos martin
Taxonomy articles created by Polbot